Alexander Grey Zulu (3 September 1924 – 16 August 2020) was a Zambian politician and freedom fighter.

Zulu was born in Chipata. He was subsequently educated at Munali Secondary School in Lusaka.

After serving in several positions, Zulu was appointed Minister of Commerce and Industry 1964; Minister of Transport and Works 1964; Minister of Mines and Cooperatives 1965–67; Minister of Home Affairs 1967–70; Minister of Defence 1970–73; Secretary General of the Party (equivalent to vice president) 1973–78; Secretary of State for Defense and Security 1979–85; Secretary General 1986–1991.

He had four sons and four daughters.

References

1924 births
2020 deaths
Members of the National Assembly of Zambia
Members of the Legislative Council of Northern Rhodesia
Transport ministers of Zambia
Defence Ministers of Zambia
Mines ministers of Zambia
Commerce, Trade and Industry ministers of Zambia
Home Affairs ministers of Zambia
Alumni of Munali Secondary School
People from Chipata District